Myniya Smith (born July 21, 1981) is a former professional indoor football offensive lineman. He was signed by the New York Giants as an undrafted free agent in 2007. He played college football at Southern. Following the 2016 IFL season, Smith was named First Team All-IFL. On April 20, 2017, Smith signed with the Spokane Empire. On May 4, 2017, Smith was released by the Empire. On June 6, 2017, Smith signed with the Sioux Falls Storm.

References

1981 births
Living people
\]Players of American football from New Orleans 
American football offensive linemen
Southern Jaguars football players
Utah Blaze players
Billings Outlaws players
Sioux Falls Storm players
Spokane Shock players
Spokane Empire players